This is an incomplete list of drivers who have entered a World Rally Championship event.  Active drivers (listed in bold in the tables) are those who have entered a WRC event within the past twelve months.

All WRC drivers

See also
List of female World Rally Championship drivers
List of World Rally Championship-2 drivers
List of World Rally Championship co-drivers

References

ewrc-results.com

 
World Rally Championship drivers
Championship drivers